Makvala Kasrashvili is a Georgian opera singer (soprano).

Born 13 March 1942 (not 15 March 1948, as some sources incorrectly state) in Kutaisi, Georgian SSR, she graduated from Tbilisi State Conservatory in 1966. Since 1968, she has been a soloist with Bolshoi Theatre, Moscow. Beginning with her international debut at Metropolitan Opera, New York City, in 1979, she has also performed at Royal Opera House and Covent Garden, London. She was awarded State Prizes of Georgia in 1983 and of Russia in 1998, and the title of People's Artist of the USSR in 1986. Since 2000, she has been the Director of Opera at the Bolshoi Theatre.

References 
  Маквала Филимоновна Касрашвили. Belcanto.ru. Accessed on August 17, 2007.
 Makvala Kasrashvili Soprano Director of Opera. bolshoi.ru. Accessed on May 24, 2011.

1942 births
Living people
20th-century women opera singers from Georgia (country)
Russian people of Georgian descent
Operatic sopranos from Georgia (country)
People's Artists of the USSR
People from Kutaisi
Russian operatic sopranos
Soviet women singers